Dome Fuji (ドームふじ Dōmu Fuji), also called Dome F or Valkyrie Dome, is an Antarctic base located in the eastern part of Queen Maud Land at . Dome F is the site of Dome Fuji Station, a research station operated by Japan.

Discovery and naming

Environment
Owing to its location on the Antarctic Plateau and the high elevation, Dome Fuji is one of the coldest places on Earth.

Dome Fuji Station
Dome Fuji Station (ドームふじ基地 Dōmu Fuji Kichi) was established as Dome Fuji Observation Base (ドームふじ観測拠点 Dōmu Fuji Kansoku Kyoten) in January 1995. Its name was changed to "Dome Fuji Station" on April 1, 2004.

Glaciology
This first core covers a period back to 340,000 years.

A second deep core was started in 2003. The drill did not hit the bedrock, but rock particles and refrozen water have been found in the deepest ice, indicating that the bedrock is very close to the bottom of the borehole. This core greatly extends the climatic record of the first core, and according to a first, preliminary dating, it reaches back 720,000 years. The ice of the second Valkyrie Dome core is therefore the second-oldest ice ever recovered, outranged only by the EPICA Dome C core.

See also

 List of Antarctic research stations
 List of Antarctic field camps
 Airports in Antarctica
 Troll (research station)
 Asuka Station (Antarctica)
 Mizuho Station (Antarctica)
 Showa Station (Antarctica)
 Vostok Station
 Climate of Antarctica

References

External links
 Dome Fuji Deep Ice Coring Project
 Dome Fuji page of the World Data Center (WDC) for Paleoclimatology, contains downloadable data for the first core
 National Institute of Polar Research, Tokyo, Japan
 Institute of Low Temperature Science, Sapporo, Japan
 COMNAP Antarctic Facilities
 COMNAP Antarctic Facilities Map

Mountains of Queen Maud Land
Ice caps of Antarctica
Outposts of Queen Maud Land
Japanese Antarctic Program
Prince Harald Coast
1995 establishments in Antarctica